Danil Andreyevich Khoroshkov (born 24 December 2001) is a Russian football player. He plays for FC Orenburg-2.

Club career
He made his debut in the Russian Premier League for FC Orenburg on 5 July 2020 in a game against FC Rubin Kazan, replacing Fedor Černych in the 88th minute.

References

External links
 
 
 

2001 births
Living people
Russian footballers
Association football defenders
FC Orenburg players
Russian Premier League players
Russian First League players
Russian Second League players